Ghost Light is the second serial of the 26th season of the British science fiction television series Doctor Who, which was first broadcast in three weekly parts on BBC1 from 4 to 18 October 1989.

Set in a mansion house in Perivale in 1883, Josiah Smith (Ian Hogg), a cataloguer of life forms  from another planet, seeks to assassinate Queen Victoria and take over the British Empire.

Plot
Thousands of years ago, an alien expedition came to Earth to catalogue life. After completing its task and collecting samples which included Nimrod, a being known as Light, the leader, went into slumber. By 1881, Josiah Smith gained control and kept Light in hibernation and imprisoned the creature known as Control on the ship, which is now the cellar of the house. Smith began evolving into the era's dominant life-form – the Victorian gentleman – and also took over the house. By 1883, Smith, having "evolved" into forms approximating a human and casting off his old husks as an insect would, managed to lure and capture the explorer Redvers Fenn-Cooper, brainwashing him. Utilising Fenn-Cooper's association with Queen Victoria, he plans to get close to her so that he can assassinate her and subsequently take control of the British Empire.

The TARDIS arrives at Gabriel Chase. Ace had visited the house in 1983 and had felt an evil presence. The Seventh Doctor's curiosity drives him to seek answers. He encounters Control, which has now taken on human form, and makes a deal with it. The Doctor helps it release Light. Once awake, Light is displeased by all the changes while he was asleep. Smith tries to keep his plan intact, but events are moving beyond his control. As Control tries to "evolve" into a Lady, Ace tries to come to grips with her feelings about the house, revealing that she burned it down when she felt the evil. The Doctor finally convinces Light of the futility of opposing evolution, which causes him to overload and dissipate into the surrounding house. Control's complete evolution into a Lady derails Smith's plan as Fenn-Cooper, having freed himself from Smith's brainwashing, chooses to side with her instead of him. In the end, with Smith taken captive on the ship, Control, Fenn-Cooper, and Nimrod set off in the alien ship to explore the universe.

Outside references
In the dinner scene, the Doctor says, "Who was it said Earthmen never invite their ancestors round to dinner?"  This refers to Douglas Adams' The Hitchhiker's Guide to the Galaxy.

Production

Pre-production
Working titles for this story included The Bestiary and Life-Cycle. As revealed in the production notes for the DVD release, the story was renamed Das Haus der tausend Schrecken (The House of a Thousand Frights/Horrors) upon translation into German.

The story evolved out of an earlier, rejected script entitled Lungbarrow. It was to be set on Gallifrey in the Doctor's ancestral home and deal with the Doctor's past, but producer John Nathan-Turner felt that it revealed too much of the Doctor's origins. It was reworked to make both evolution and the idea of an ancient house central to the story. Marc Platt used elements of his original idea for his Virgin New Adventures novel Lungbarrow.

Production
Ghost Light was the final production of the original 26-year run, with the last recorded sequence being the final scene between Mrs Pritchard and Gwendoline. It was not, however, the last to be screened – The Curse of Fenric and Survival, both produced beforehand, followed it in transmission order.

Cast notes
Michael Cochrane and Frank Windsor had both previously appeared in Doctor Who with Peter Davison; Cochrane as Charles Cranleigh in Black Orchid in Season 19; Windsor played Ranulf in The King's Demons in Season 20. Carl Forgione appeared in the final serial of the Jon Pertwee era, Planet of the Spiders.

Commercial releases

Home media
Ghost Light was released on VHS in May 1994. A DVD was released in September 2004, with many extended and deleted scenes included as bonus features.  However, unlike The Curse of Fenric, these scenes no longer existed in broadcast quality as the master 625 line PAL colour videotapes containing the extra footage had been erased for reuse shortly after the story was broadcast, and were thus sourced from VHS copies, some with timecodes burnt-in, i.e. recorded permanently onto the picture. This made an extended edit, as had been prepared for the Curse of Fenric DVD release the previous year, impossible. This serial was also released as part of the Doctor Who DVD Files in Issue 96 on 5 September 2012. In February 2020 the full serial was released as part of the Doctor Who: The Collection Season 26 box-set with a new Extended Workprint Cut.

Extended Workprint

In print

Marc Platt's novelisation was published by Target Books in September 1990.

In June 2011, an audiobook of the novelisation was released, read by Ian Hogg.

The script, edited by John McElroy, was published by Titan Books in June 1993. Marc Platt contributed a chapter, written especially for this book, which rectified the omissions from the transmitted story.

Soundtrack release

The soundtrack album for this serial was released on Silva Screen Records in 1993 on CD with a cover adapted from the novelisation cover.

 It was reissued on CD with extra tracks on 26 August 2013 with a new cover.

Track listing

Critical analysis 
A book length study written by Jonathan Dennis was published as part of The Black Archive series from Obverse Books in 2016.

The serial was covered in volume 46 of the Doctor Who: The Complete History, which reprinted Andrew Pixley's Archive features from Doctor Who Magazine and the various Doctor Who Magazine Special Editions, as well as new articles created specifically for the book.

References

External links 

 
 
 Script to Screen: Ghost Light, by Jon Preddle (Time Space Visualiser issue 40, July 1994)

Target novelisation 

 On Target – Ghost Light

1989 British television episodes
Doctor Who pseudohistorical serials
Evolution in popular culture
Fiction set in 1883
Films with screenplays by Marc Platt
Fiction about neanderthals
Ghost Light
Steampunk television episodes
Television episodes set in London
Victorian era in popular culture
Television episodes set in the 19th century